The 1815 New Hampshire gubernatorial election was held on March 14, 1815.

Incumbent Federalist Governor John Taylor Gilman defeated Democratic-Republican nominee William Plumer in a re-match of the previous year's election.

General election

Candidates
John Taylor Gilman, Federalist, incumbent Governor
William Plumer, Democratic-Republican, former Governor

Results

Notes

References

1815
New Hampshire
Gubernatorial